Cryptoblepharus yulensis is a species of skink, a lizard in the family Scincidae. The species is endemic to Papua New Guinea.

References

Further reading
Cogger HG (2014). Reptiles and Amphibians of Australia, Seventh Edition. Clayton, Victoria, Australia: CSIRO Publishing. xxx + 1,033 pp. .
Horner P (2007). "Systematics of the snake-eyed skinks, Cryptoblepharus Wiegmann (Reptilia: Squamata: Scincidae) – an Australian-based review". The Beagle Supplement 3: 21–198. (Cryptoblepharus yulensis, new species).
Wilson, Steve; Swan, Gerry (2013). A Complete Guide to Reptiles of Australia, Fourth Edition. Sydney: New Holland Publishers. 522 pp. .

Cryptoblepharus
Reptiles of Papua New Guinea
Endemic fauna of Papua New Guinea
Reptiles described in 2007
Taxa named by Paul Horner (herpetologist)
Skinks of New Guinea